Maddy Grant (born 12 March 2001) is a Canadian rugby union player. She competed for Canada at the delayed 2021 Rugby World Cup in New Zealand. She featured in the semifinal against England, and in the third place final against France.

References

External links 

 Maddy Grant at Canada Rugby

Living people
2001 births
Female rugby union players
Canadian female rugby union players
Canada women's international rugby union players